Örvar-Oddr ("Arrow-Odd" or "Arrow's Point") is a legendary hero about whom an anonymous Icelander wrote a fornaldarsaga in the latter part of the 13th century. Örvar-Odds saga, the Saga of Örvar-Odd, became very popular and contains old legends and songs. He also appears in Hervarar saga and, concerning the battle on Samsø, in Gesta Danorum.

Plot summary

Prophecy 
Oddr was the son of Grímr Loðinkinni and the grandson of Ketill Hængr (both of whom have their own sagas) of Hålogaland. When he was an infant, a völva predicted that he would be killed by his own horse Faxi, at the place where he was born, at the age of three hundred (which may very well signify 360, as a hundred by the time was a unit of numbers denoting 120, rather than 100 - which have been called a petty hundred).

In order to undo the prediction, he killed his horse, buried it deep in the ground and left his home intending never to return again. As he was leaving, his father gave him some magic arrows (Gusisnautar) which soon earned him the cognomen arrow. After a voyage to Finnmark, Bjarmaland, Holmgård, Constantinople and Jotunheim, he fought successfully against several Vikings.

Hjalmar and Angantyr 

However, when he encountered the Swedish champion Hjalmar, he met his match. The fight was even and the two warriors not only became friends, but entered sworn brotherhood.

The two heroes fought many battles together (for more see Hjalmar), until after the famous battle of Samsø against the sons of Arngrim, Örvar-Oddr had to bring the dead Hjalmar (killed by Angantyr) to Uppsala and his betrothed Ingeborg, the daughter of the Swedish king.

Örvar-Oddr travelled in the South fighting against the corsairs of the Mediterranean, he was baptised in Sicily, was shipwrecked and arrived alone in the Holy Land.

Ögmundr Flóki 
Oddr sought vengeance against Ögmundr Flóki ("Ogmund Tussock" or Ögmundr 'tuft'; aka Ögmundr Eyþjófsbani or "Eythjof's-killer") for the murder of his blood-brother Þórðr stafnglamr (Thord Prow-Gleam). He and his crew headed toward a fjord in Helluland ("Slabland"), where Ögmundr was to be found, according to Oddr's half-giant son, Vignir. During their voyage, they encounter two huge sea-creatures that resembled islands:

There had been five men sent to disembark on what they thought was an island, but the Heather-Back (lyngbakr) plunged into sea, and those men perished. However, the group had safely sailed through the jaws of the Sea-Reek (hafgufa), the other monster that Ögmundr had sent by magic to intercept the party.

Barkman 
Oddr becomes Barkman (naefrmaðr, 'birch bark man'), a sort of wildman dressed in bark. He arrived in Hunaland and meets King Herrauðr, where his true identity was soon revealed due to his heroic actions. After defeating the king of Bjalkaland ("pelt country"), who used to pay tribute to the king of Hunaland, he married the Herrauðr' daughter Silkisif and became the next king.

Death 
After all this, Oddr became homesick and went back home. Walking over the grave of Faxi, he mocked the old prophecy, but tripped over the skull of a horse from which a snake appeared. The snake bit him and he died.

Analysis
The saga includes several stories, such as the voyage of Ottar from Hålogaland to Bjarmaland, the legend of Hjalmar's foster-brother (originally named Söte), Starkaðr, Ketil Höing, Odysseus and Polyphemus, Sigurd Jorsalfare and the Rus' ruler Oleg of Novgorod (the attack on Bjalkaland).

The motive of Örvar-Oddr's mocking the prophecy and death has parallels in the Primary Chronicle, which describes the manner of the death of Oleg (also of Varangian origin) in similar terms. Oleg's death from "the skull of a horse" is also the subject of one of the best known ballads in the Russian language, written by Alexander Pushkin in 1826.

Ögmundr Flóki owned a cloak made from the beards of kings he collected, as did the giant of Mont Saint-Michel, enemy of King Arthur in Brittany.

See also
 Hrafnistumannasögur

Explanatory notes

References
Citations

Bibliography

 

 (First English translation)

External links
Proverbs and proverbial materials in Örvar-Odds saga
The Danish historian Saxo Grammaticus on Orvar-Odd
The Old Norse text of the Saga

Tyrfing cycle
Legendary sagas
Heroes in Norse myths and legends